Saint Cecilia's Church of England School (commonly referred to as 'Saint Cecilia's') is a Church of England secondary school in Southfields, south-west London. It opened in 2003 as Saint Cecilia's, Wandsworth Church of England School, and was renamed on 1 March 2015. Music and Mathematics are the school's specialisms.

History
It opened as a voluntary aided school in September 2003 with one year group of 150 pupils. It has been growing incrementally year by year until it reached 750 pupils across Years 7 to 11 in the 2007/2008 academic year. It opened its sixth form in 2008. There are now approximately 900 pupils and students at the school including Sixth Formers. The School has also previously won the 2010 Schools Question Time Challenge.

In March 2015 the school converted to academy status.

In 2019, the school launched the Saint Cecilia's Rugby Academy as a partnership with Premier Rugby Club, London Irish. Each year, 26 boys from the Sixth Form will train with the professionals whilst studying for A Levels and BTECs at the school.

Former school on the site
Saint Cecilia's occupies a part of the site of the former Wandsworth School, a boys' secondary school that merged to become John Archer School in 1986, before finally closing in 1991. Some of the former school's land was sold off for housing, with the original 1927 building converted into flats. Proceeds from the sale of the land helped to finance the £12.4 million cost of building Saint Cecilia's on the southern part of the site.

Admissions

Saint Cecilia’s Church of England School now admits 180 pupils into Year 7 each year. The school participates in the coordinated admission scheme of Wandsworth Council. Saint Cecilia's also adheres to the common timetable for admissions including the arrangements for dealing with applications received after the closing date as set out in Wandsworth Council's scheme.

School life

Academic life
Saint Cecilia's Church of England school caters for pupils of all genders aged 11 to 18.

House System
In July 2009 it was announced the school would begin a house system. In September 2009 five houses were introduced. They were (with house colours later voted for by the pupils of each house):

Schubert (Canary Yellow)
Archimedes (Royal Purple)
Ives (Crimson Red)
Newton (Prussian Blue)
Turing (Lime Green)

In 2021, a sixth house, Carter, was launched named after famed jazz musician, Betty Carter. Its house colour is bright orange. The house names spell S-A-I-N-T-C.

Sixth Form
In September 2008 the school expansion led to the opening of the school's sixth form. The Sixth Form caters for around 200 pupils across both the Lower and Upper Sixth.

Academic performance
Saint Cecilia's is a high achieving school and every year, GCSE and A Level results are well above average, among the best in Wandsworth LEA.

Sport
The school has rugby, netball, athletics and football teams that take part in weekly local and regional competitions. Every year, pupils are given the option to take part in the Wimbledon Championships Ball Boys and Girls.

References

Sources
 Rough-sleeping schoolchildren raise more than £3,000 for the homeless
 Schools win Question Time Challenge
 2020 - The Diocese of Southwark
 
 Students celebrate A-level results
 Balham People | Wandsworth GCSE results continue to improve

External links
 Former school
 Former school choir
 Previous schools

Secondary schools in the London Borough of Wandsworth
Church of England secondary schools in the Diocese of Southwark
Educational institutions established in 2003
2003 establishments in England
Academies in the London Borough of Wandsworth